Brightwaters is an incorporated village in the southwestern part of the Town of Islip in Suffolk County, on Long Island, in New York, United States. The population was 3,103 at the time of the 2010 census.

History 
Brightwaters was developed in the early 20th Century by the T.B. Ackerson Company, which was known for its work in Brooklyn. 

By 1916, locals felt that their community, which at the time was still an unincorporated part of the Town of Islip, would be better off if they were to incorporate as a village, citing concerns over how their community was being taxed and how they had to pay for private subscriptions for things which the believed should have been provided through taxes paid to Islip. This led to locals signing a petition to incorporate Brightwaters as a village. The petition was given to the Town of Islip on September 20, 1916, and Brightwaters became an incorporated village on November 30, 1916.

Geography

It contains Wohseepee Park in northern Brightwaters, the Brightwaters Canal directly south of Montauk Highway, and four lakes directly north of Montauk Highway: Cascades Lake, Mirror Lake, Lagoon Lake and Nosrekca Lake. The village's businesses are located at the intersection of Windsor Avenue and Orinoco Drive (referred to as Brightwaters Village). These geographic features make up the three districts of the village; the Canal District (southern Brightwaters, everything south of Montauk Highway), the Lakes District (central Brightwaters, everything north of the highway to Union Boulevard) and the Wohseepee Park District (northern Brightwaters, everything north of Union Boulevard to Seneca Drive).

Brightwaters uses the 11718 ZIP code, which is distinct from the Bay Shore Postal District (11706).

Demographics

2010 census 
As of the census of 2010, there were 3,103 people residing in the village. The racial makeup of the village was 94.26% White, 1.51% African American, 1.61% Asian, 0.03% Native American, 0.87% from other races, and 1.71% from two or more races. Hispanic or Latino of any race were 5.12% of the population.

Census 2000 
As of the census of 2000, there were 3,248 people, 1,127 households, and 912 families residing in the village. The population density was 3,299.2 people per square mile (1,279.7/km2). There were 1,144 housing units at an average density of 1,162.0 per square mile (450.7/km2). The racial makeup of the village was 95.23% White, 1.57% African American, 0.06% Native American, 1.29% Asian, 0.06% Pacific Islander, 0.65% from other races, and 1.14% from two or more races. Hispanic or Latino of any race were 4.06% of the population.

There were 1,127 households, out of which 38.9% had children under the age of 18 living with them, 71.8% were married couples living together, 6.8% had a female householder with no husband present, and 19.0% were non-families. 14.6% of all households were made up of individuals, and 5.9% had someone living alone who was 65 years of age or older. The average household size was 2.87 and the average family size was 3.20.

In the village, the population was spread out, with 27.3% under the age of 18, 5.0% from 18 to 24, 28.8% from 25 to 44, 27.2% from 45 to 64, and 11.7% who were 65 years of age or older. The median age was 38 years. For every 100 females, there were 93.7 males. For every 100 females age 18 and over, there were 94.7 males.

The median income for a household in the village in 2016 was $146,892, and the median income for a family was $121,569  About 0.8% of families and 1.8% of the population were below the poverty line, including 0.7% of those under age 18 and none of those age 65 or over.

Parks and recreation 
Parks in Brightwaters include:

 Gilbert Park
 Walker Beach
 Wohseepee Park

Government 
As of July 2021, the Mayor of Brightwaters is John J. Valdini, and the Village Trustees are Mary Del Vecchio, Michael Dopsovic, Patrick Fawcett, and Thomas Zepf.

In the 2021 U.S. presidential election, the majority of Brightwaters voters voted for Joe Biden (D).

Education

School district 
Brightwaters residents are served by the Bay Shore Union Free School District. As such, all children who reside within Brightwaters and attend public schools go to Bay Shore's schools.

Library district 
Brightwaters is located wholly within the boundaries of the Bay Shore–Brightwaters Public Library District.

Notable person
 Rick Lazio – Congressman, 2000 Senatorial candidate, and former gubernatorial candidate (R).

References

External links

 Brightwaters official website

Islip (town), New York
Villages in New York (state)
Villages in Suffolk County, New York
Populated coastal places in New York (state)